The Basil Sellers Art Prize is a long-term project, with biennial awards. The exhibit tours by collaboration of the Ian Potter Museum of Art, the University of Melbourne, and NETS Victoria (National Exhibition Touring Support Victoria). It is aimed at changing Australian's perception and enjoyment of art and sport.

History
The Basil Sellers Art Prize encouraged a dynamic and critical reflection on all forms of sport and sporting culture in Australia.

Sport has been a recurring theme in Australian art. For contemporary artists today, sport touches upon anything from everyday life through to globalisation, from the concrete experience of a game through to abstract notions like cheating and fair play. Sport is about winners and losers, individuals and teams, rules and penalties, equipment and architecture, fans and souvenirs, triumphs and scandals.

The prize encouraged contemporary artists to develop their practice, to engage with the many themes within sport past and present, and to contribute to critical reflection on all forms of sport and sporting culture in Australia.

The biennial award and exhibition of finalists ran from 2008 to 2016 at the Ian Potter Museum of Art presenting sculpture, painting, photography and drawing by contemporary Australian artists offering $100,000 for a single outstanding work of art.

The Basil Sellers Art Prize was supported by Basil Sellers AM and aimed to encourage contemporary artists to develop their practice, to engage with the many themes within sport past and present, and to contribute to critical reflection on all forms of sport and sporting culture in Australia.

2018 exhibition touring schedule
"Play on: The art of sport / 10 years of the Basil Sellers Art Prize"

Hazelhurst Regional Gallery and Arts Centre, NSW
9 Dec 2017 – 11 Feb 2018

Mornington Peninsula Regional Gallery, VIC
2 Mar – 29 Apr 2018

Devonport Regional Gallery, TAS
7 Jul – 19 Aug 2018

UQ Art Museum, QLD
24 Nov 2018 – 3 Feb 2019

Bunbury Regional Art Galleries, WA
8 Mar – 5 May 2019

Riddoch Art Gallery, SA
24 May – 2 Aug 2019

Western Plains Cultural Centre, NSW
31 Aug – 3 Nov 2019

See also
 Basil Sellers

References

University of Melbourne